Sanela Diana Jenkins (born Sanela Dijana Ćatić; 1973) is an entrepreneur and philanthropist who was born and raised in Bosnia and Herzegovina. She currently resides in California. Jenkins fled her home country during the siege of Sarajevo and immigrated to London, where she studied at City University, London.

Career
After graduating with a degree in Computer Science and Economics from City University, London, she acquired the swimwear line Melissa Odabash.

In 2009, Sanela created and launched the Neuro line of functional beverages based in Sherman Oaks, California where she currently is President and CEO.

Diana Jenkins is the founder and CEO of D Empire Entertainment, a music label that represents emerging and established artists within the intersection of traditional and innovative media strategy, branding, publicity, recording, distribution and licensing.

In 2021, Jenkins joined the cast of The Real Housewives of Beverly Hills for the twelfth season. She made her debut in May 2022.

Philanthropic activities
Sanela Diana Jenkins established The Irnis Catic Foundation in 2002 in memory of her brother who was killed during the Bosnian War. The foundation provides essential funding to the medical facilities at the University of Sarajevo. In 2009, Diana Jenkins was awarded the Peace Connection prize by the Center for Peace and Multi-Ethnic Cooperation.

On May 5, 2018, Jenkins was honored at the Advisory Council for Bosnia & Herzegovina Gala in Washington, D.C. for her continued support and philanthropic activities in the country.

Along with George Clooney Jenkins hosted an A-List fundraiser in Mayfair London in 2008 for the victims of Darfur, raising over £10 million.

She established the Sanela Diana Jenkins Human Rights Project at the University of California, Los Angeles in August 2008. The clinic concentrates on legal advocacy, political advocacy and documentation. It is the first endowed program on international justice and human rights at any law school in the western United States.

In 2009, Jenkins founded the Sanela Diana Jenkins Human Rights Project along with Richard Steinberg. Together they hosted the Sanela Diana Jenkins Clinic on Gender Violence in Eastern Congo.  The Clinic has established the Restore the Village Project, which is conducted a series of humanitarian interventions in villages affected by mass rape attacks, and is carefully studying the effects of these interventions in order to determine how to best help communities in need and better understand the phenomenon of mass rape.

Immediately following the 2010 earthquake in Haiti, Jenkins and actor Sean Penn established the Jenkins-Penn Haitian Relief Organization to deliver hospital supplies and provide medical care to thousands of displaced Haitians. She compared the long-term recovery in Haiti to that in Bosnia and Herzegovina, highlighted the need for basic humanitarian aid, and argued that the U.S. military should not leave the country prematurely.

In March 2010, Jenkins posted bail for former President of the Federation of Bosnia and Herzegovina Ejup Ganić, who was detained in London on a Serbian extradition request.

Sanela was honored with the Enduring Vision award by the Elton John AIDS Foundation for her activism in the fight against AIDS.

Sanela produced a photography book entitled "Room 23", photographed by Deborah Anderson. Many of the celebrities in the book are friends of Jenkins, including George Clooney and Elton John.  Proceeds from the sale of the book benefit several philanthropic programs.

In 2022, Jenkins founded the Sunela Foundation with a donation of $100,000 for the victims of Lion Air Flight 601.

Personal life
In 1999, she married Roger Jenkins who was a prominent executive at Barclays Bank. The couple met at the gym at the Barbican, where Jenkins was living after the end of his marriage to his first wife, a banker at Barclays. They have two children together and later divorced.

In 2020, Jenkins welcomed a child with then-boyfriend Asher Monroe. The couple subsequently announced their engagement. Jenkins later suffered a miscarriage. In December 2022, it was announced that the couple were expecting another child.

References

External links
 Solway, Diane. "Second Life: Diana Jenkins". W. July 2010.
 SunelaFoundation.org 

1973 births
Living people
Bosniaks of Bosnia and Herzegovina
Businesspeople from Sarajevo
Bosnia and Herzegovina emigrants to the United Kingdom
British emigrants to the United States
Yugoslav Wars refugees